Luigi Trombetta (3 February 1820 – 17 January 1900) was an Italian cardinal.

References

1820 births
1900 deaths
People from Lanuvio
19th-century Italian cardinals
Cardinals created by Pope Leo XIII